Kevin Young  (born November 8, 1970) is an American poet and the director of the Smithsonian Institution National Museum of African American History and Culture since 2021. Author of 11 books and editor of eight others, Young previously served as Director of the Schomburg Center for Research in Black Culture at the New York Public Library. A winner of a Guggenheim Fellowship as well as a finalist for the National Book Award for his 2003 collection Jelly Roll: A Blues, Young was Atticus Haygood Professor of English and Creative Writing at Emory University and curator of Emory's Raymond Danowski Poetry Library. In March 2017, Young was named poetry editor of The New Yorker.

Early life
Born in Lincoln, Nebraska, Young was the only child of two working parents, his father, Dr. Paul E. Young, was an ophthalmologist and his mother, Dr. Azzie Young, a chemist. Due to the careers of both of his parents, his family moved frequently throughout his youth. Young lived in six different places before he reached the age of ten, but his family ultimately settled in Topeka, Kansas. He first began to pursue writing when he was thirteen years old, after he attended a summer writing class at Washburn University.

Young attended Harvard College, where he studied with Seamus Heaney and Lucie Brock-Broido and became friends with writer Colson Whitehead. He graduated in 1992, then held a Stegner Fellowship at Stanford University (1992–94), where he worked with Denise Levertov. He received his Master of Fine Arts from Brown University, where Michael S. Harper served as a significant influence.

Career
While in Boston and Providence, he was part of the African-American poetry group the Dark Room Collective. He is heavily influenced by the poets Langston Hughes, John Berryman, and Emily Dickinson and by the artist Jean-Michel Basquiat.

Young wrote much of his debut collection, Most Way Home, while still an undergraduate. Published by William Morrow in 1995, Most Way Home was selected by Lucille Clifton for the National Poetry Series and won Ploughshares John C. Zacharis First Book Award. Writing in Ploughshares, Rob Arnold observes that in that first book Young "explores his own family's narratives, showing an uncanny awareness of voice and persona."

Young has described his next three books – To Repel Ghosts (named for a Jean-Michel Basquiat painting), Jelly Roll (a collection of love poems named for Jelly Roll Morton), and Black Maria – as an "American trilogy", calling the series Devil's Music.

Young's collection The Book of Hours (Knopf, 2014) won the 2015 Lenore Marshall Poetry Prize.

Young is also the author of For The Confederate Dead, Dear Darkness, Blues Laws: Selected and Uncollected Poems 1995–2015 (2016) and editor of Giant Steps: The New Generation of African American Writers (2000), Blues Poems (2003), Jazz Poems (2006), and John Berryman's Selected Poems (2004).

His poem "Black Cat Blues," originally published in The Virginia Quarterly Review, was included in The Best American Poetry 2005. Young's poetry has also appeared in The New Yorker, Poetry Magazine, The Paris Review, Ploughshares, and other literary magazines. In 2007, he served as guest editor for an issue of Ploughshares. He has written on art and artists for museums in Los Angeles and Minneapolis.

His 2003 book of poems Jelly Roll was a finalist for the National Book Award. Young was named a Guggenheim Foundation Fellow in 2003, as well as an NEA Literature Fellow in Poetry.

After stints at the University of Georgia and Indiana University, Young taught writing at Emory University, where he was the Atticus Haygood Professor of English and Creative Writing, as well as the curator of the Raymond Danowski Poetry Library, a large collection of first and rare editions of poetry in English.

In September 2016, Young became the Director of the Schomburg Center for Research in Black Culture at the New York Public Library.

In March 2017, he was named poetry editor of The New Yorker, to begin in November 2017.

Young is working on two books: a non-fiction book called Bunk on the U.S. history of lies and hoaxes, and a poetry collection that he has described as being "about African American history and also personal history, growing up in Kansas, which has a long black history including Langston Hughes and others."

In September 2020, he was named director of the National Museum of African-American History and Culture, to begin in January 2021. Elected to the American Academy of Arts and Sciences, the American Academy of Arts and Letters, and the Society of American Historians,Young was also named a Chancellor of the Academy of American Poets in 2020.

Personal life
Young lives in New York. He married Kate Tuttle, book columnist at The Boston Globe in 2005.

Awards
 1992: Harvard University, Thomas T. Hoopes Prize for Most Way Home (Thesis/dissertation)
 1993: National Poetry Series (selection) by Lucille Clifton for Most Way Home
 1993: Ploughshares, John C. Zacharis First Book Prize for Most Way Home
 2003: Patterson Poetry Prize
 2003: National Book Award (Poetry) (finalist) for Jelly Roll 
 2003: Los Angeles Times, Book Prize (Poetry) (finalist) for Jelly Roll
 2003: Guggenheim Fellowship
 2007: Patterson Poetry Prize for Sustained Literary Achievement
 2007: Quill Awards (Poetry) for For the Confederate Dead
 2009: United States Artists, Fellow Award
 2009: Pat Conroy Southern Book Prize (Poetry) for Dear Darkness
 2013: National Book Critics Circle Award for Criticism (finalist) for The Grey Album
 2013: PEN/Open Book for The Grey Album
 2014: Claremont Graduate University, Kingsley Tufts Poetry Award for Book of Hours
 2015: Black Caucus of the American Library Association Literary Award (Poetry) for Book of Hours
 2015: Academy of American Poets, Lenore Marshall Poetry Prize for Book of Hours
 2016: American Academy of Arts and Sciences
 2016: National Book Award, Autobiography/Biography (Hardcover) (longlisted) for Blue Laws
 2017: Anisfield-Wolf Book Award in Nonfiction for Bunk
 2017: Georgia Writers Hall of Fame Inductee
 2017: National Book Critics Circle Award (finalist) for Bunk
 2017: PEN/Jean Stein Book Award (finalist) for Bunk
2021: T. S. Eliot Prize (shortlist) for Stones

Bibliography

Poetry 
Collections
 
 
 
 
 
 
 
 
 
 
 
 
Anthologies (edited)
 
 
 
 
 
 
List of poems

Non-fiction

Theses and dissertations

References

External links

 
 
 Kevin Young reading at the Key West Literary Seminar, 2008
 Biography at poets.org
 Reading his poem "Elegy, Father's Day", on Slate.com
 Levi Rubeck reviews Kevin Young's book Ardency
 Kevin Young Interview, failbetter, October 6, 2009

1970 births
Living people
Poets from Nebraska
Harvard College alumni
University of Georgia faculty
Indiana University faculty
Emory University faculty
Writers from Lincoln, Nebraska
The New Yorker editors
American literary critics
Brown University alumni
African-American poets
New York Public Library people
American Book Award winners
20th-century American poets
21st-century American poets
20th-century American male writers
21st-century American male writers
Poets from Kansas
Writers from Topeka, Kansas
20th-century African-American writers
21st-century African-American writers
Members of the American Academy of Arts and Letters
Fellows of the American Academy of Arts and Sciences